Jonathan Barry "Jon" Beswetherick (born 15 January 1978) is an English retired footballer who played as a defender.

Playing career
Beswetherick was born in Liverpool, before moving to Plymouth where he started his career at his home town club of Plymouth Argyle making over 100 appearances before moving to Sheffield Wednesday. During his time at Hillsborough Beswetherick had loan spells at Swindon Town and Macclesfield Town and he eventually left Sheffield Wednesday to join Bristol Rovers. He appeared in the famous Jimmy Glass game against Carlisle, in which the goalkeeper scored in the 94th minute to keep Carlisle United in the Football League.

He briefly played with the Bristol Rovers before signing for Kidderminster Harriers where another short spell was followed by a move to Conference National side Forest Green Rovers. He was released by the Gloucestershire based club and dropped two divisions to sign for Salisbury City where he found two successful promotions to the Conference National as well as making over 50 appearances.

On 8 September 2007, Beswetherick joined Mangotsfield United on loan. His debut came the same day in a 0–0 draw with Hitchin Town. He made five Southern Football League Premier Division appearances, his last coming on 9 October 2007.

His spell at Mangotsfield was soon followed by another one-month loan to Weston-super-Mare on 4 January 2008. During this spell, he only managed 3 league games for Weston before being returned to Salisbury City.

He was released from Salisbury City in May 2008. He joined Bath City F.C. in July 2008 on a pre-season trial, but eventually joined Paulton Rovers. He was released in June 2009 due to work commitments. "The decision is just down to Jon's job as a policeman and being unable to commit himself for every game," said manager Andrew Jones. "It has nothing to do with his ability, as he is a quality player and did well for us."

References

External links

Salisbury City Bio

1978 births
Living people
Footballers from Liverpool
English footballers
Association football defenders
Plymouth Argyle F.C. players
Sheffield Wednesday F.C. players
Swindon Town F.C. players
Macclesfield Town F.C. players
Bristol Rovers F.C. players
Kidderminster Harriers F.C. players
Forest Green Rovers F.C. players
Salisbury City F.C. players
Mangotsfield United F.C. players
Weston-super-Mare A.F.C. players
English Football League players
National League (English football) players
Paulton Rovers F.C. players